The 2015 IBSF World Under-18 Snooker Championship was an amateur snooker tournament that took place from 3 October to 10 October 2015 in St. Petersburg, Russia  It was the 1st edition of the IBSF World Under-18 Snooker Championship.

The tournament was won by number 8 seed Ka Wai Cheung who defeated fellow countryman Ming Tung Chan 5–2 in the final.

Results

Round 1
Best of 5 frames

References

2015 in snooker
Snooker amateur tournaments
Sports competitions in Saint Petersburg
2015 in Russian sport
International sports competitions hosted by Russia
October 2015 sports events in Russia
2015 in Saint Petersburg